"Call It Love" is a song by British pop group Deuce, released in January 1995 as the debut single from their only album, On the Loose! (1995). It was a sizeable hit, peaking at number seven in Scotland, number eleven in the UK and number fourteen in Ireland. Outside Europe, it was a huge hit in Israel, where it reached number-one for one week. A music video was produced to promote the single. It features a cameo by Tony Mortimer from East 17.

Critical reception
British columnist James Masterton viewed the song as a "catchy slice of European pop", adding that it "is easily one of the best pop records on the chart at the moment." A reviewer from Music & Media commented, "A big hit on British turf, Deuce's ace is finally hitting the Continent's baseline." The magazine's Maria Jimenez described it as "slick Eurodance", complimenting it as a high quality track of its dance sub-genre. James Hamilton from Music Weeks RM Dance Update viewed it as "ABBA-ishly sung cantering". In an retrospective review, Pop Rescue declared it as a "perfect pop gem".

Track listing
 12", UK (1994)"Call It Love" (JX Kissy Kissy Mix)
"Call It Love" (Diss-Cuss Moris Or Doris Mix)
"Call It Love" (Movin' Melodies Spank Mix)
"Call It Love" (Primax One Night Stand Mix)

 CD single, UK (1994)"Call It Love" (Teen Sparkle Mix) — 4:04
"Call It Love" (J-X Kissy Kissy Mix) — 7:11
"Call It Love" (Movin' Melodies Spank Mix) — 6:27
"Call It Love" (J-PAC Youth Yob Mix) — 4:39
"Call It Love" (Primax One Night Stand Mix) — 5:54

 CD maxi, Europe (1994)'
"Call It Love" (Teen Sparkle Mix) — 4:02
"Call It Love" (J-X Kissy Kissy Mix) — 7:12
"Call It Love" (Movin' Melodies Spank Mix) — 6:28
"Call It Love" (J-PAC Youth Yob Mix) — 4:39

Charts

References

 

1995 debut singles
1995 songs
Dance-pop songs
Eurodance songs
London Records singles
Number-one singles in Israel
Songs written by Ian Curnow
Songs written by Phil Harding (producer)
Songs written by Tom Watkins (music manager)